Noddle was a credit report service offered by the British arm of American company TransUnion (formerly CallCredit). The business was launched in 2011 and was sold to Credit Karma in 2019.

History 
In June 2011, 10,000 people were invited to test the service prior to its full launch later that year.

In November 2018, Credit Karma said it would acquire Noddle from TransUnion. At the time, the company had 35 employees and four million users. The acquisition closed in April 2019 and the Noddle brand was replaced with Credit Karma branding.

Products 
The service advertised that its clients were able to view a full credit report free for life, unlike the similar paid-for services from rivals Equifax and Experian. Noddle charged for extra services such as Noddle Improve, which told users how to improve their credit scores, and Noddle Web Watch, which scanned websites looking for fraudulent uses of users' information and warning users about anything that appeared awry.

If clients saw any discrepancies in their reports, they had to dispute issues with the pertinent reference agency.

Notes

References

External links
 

Financial services companies established in 2011
Credit scoring
2019 mergers and acquisitions